Joyner Monte Lourenco (born 8 September 1991) is an Indian professional footballer who plays as a defender for I-League club Real Kashmir.

Club career

Born in Goa, Lourenco began his career with Goa Velha, a local club in the state. In 2010, Lourenco joined professional I-League side Sporting Goa. He made his debut for the club on 28 October 2011 in a league match against Pune. He came on as a substitute for Boboi Singh as Sporting Goa drew the match 2–2.

Bengaluru
On 23 July 2017, Lourenco was selected in the 14th round of the 2017–18 ISL Players Draft by Bengaluru for the 2017–18 Indian Super League season. He made his debut for bengaluru fc in their 2018 AFC Cup Preliminary Round match against Transport United.He came as 75th minute substitute for Prashanth Kalinga. He made a total of 5 appearances for the club in 2018 AFC Cup. On 8 June 2018 Bengaluru fc released Joyner along with 4 other players.

Mumbai City FC
In October 2018 he joined Mumbai City FC. on 27 October 2018 he made his ISL debut as he played a full 90 minutes for the club against Delhi Dynamos FC.

International
On 9 September 2014, Lourenco was selected in the 20 man India U23 side for the 2014 Asian Games. He proceeded to make his debut for the side on 15 September 2014 against the United Arab Emirates. He started the match but couldn't prevent India from losing 5–0.

Career statistics

Club

Personal life
He married  Montia De Souza on January 14, 2020

References

1991 births
Living people
Indian footballers
Sporting Clube de Goa players
Bengaluru FC players
Association football defenders
Footballers at the 2014 Asian Games
Footballers from Goa
I-League players
Goa Professional League players
India youth international footballers
Asian Games competitors for India
Mumbai City FC players
Indian Super League players
Jamshedpur FC players
East Bengal Club players